Esho is a surname. Notable people with the surname include: 

Mark Esho (born 1962), British entrepreneur
Tijion Esho (born 1981), British doctor